Rakhee Sandilya is an Indian writer, and documentary filmmaker, who made her debut as a feature director with the film Ribbon (film).

Career 
She previously worked as an Assistant Director for the movie Main Aur Mr. Riight.

Sandilya studied in London and worked on various award-winning documentaries including ‘MY BABY NOT MINE’, ‘Heritage India’ and ‘Desi Folk’ for Epic Channel. Apart from movies, she has worked on many Television Commercials and corporate films.

In 2017, she co-wrote and directed Ribbon (film) that starred Kalki Koechlin and Sumeet Vyas.

Filmography

References

External links 
 

Living people
Indian women film directors
Hindi-language film directors
21st-century Indian women writers
21st-century Indian writers
Indian women screenwriters
21st-century Indian film directors
Hindi screenwriters
Year of birth missing (living people)
21st-century Indian screenwriters